Mullah Attiya al-Jamri (c.1899 – 29 August 1981) was a Bahraini khatib and poet.

Researcher Clive Holes translated two of Al-Jamri's poems into books, one of which was distributed to 11,000 teachers from different schools in the UK which meant that the short story was read by over 330,000 students. Al-Jamri is well recognized in Bahrain, the Gulf and Iraq for his poems about Imam Hussain and for his unique methods of reading lamentation poems during the month of Muharram.

References

Further reading
 The Rat and the Ship’s Captain: a dialogue poem from the Gulf, with some comments on the social and literary-historical background of the genre, Studia Orientalia 75 (1995), 101-120.
The Debate of Pearl-Diving and Oil Wells: a poetic commentary on socio-economic change in the Gulf of the 1930s, Arabic and Middle Eastern Literatures Vol 1 No 1 (1998), 87-112.

1890s births
1981 deaths
20th-century Bahraini poets